Nathalie Vadim (born 7 December 1957) is the daughter of Roger Vadim and actress Annette Strøyberg. While her father was married to Oscar-winning actor Jane Fonda, Vadim's family would go on vacations that lasted several weeks or a month to Saint-Tropez or the Arcachon Bay and spend time in the mountains or on the water. In May 1987, Vadim worked as second assistant director on her father's remake film And God Created Woman. Like her father, she has been involved in directing many films.

References

External links
 

1958 births
French people of Danish descent
French people of Russian descent
Living people